For information on all Sacred Heart University sports, see Sacred Heart Pioneers

The Sacred Heart Pioneers football program is the intercollegiate American football team for the Sacred Heart University located in the U.S. state of Connecticut. The team competes in the NCAA Division I Football Championship Subdivision (FCS) and are members of the Northeast Conference. The school's first football team was fielded in 1993. The team plays its home games at the 3,334 seat Campus Field.

History

Classifications
1991–1992: NCAA Division III
1993–1998: NCAA Division II
1999–present: NCAA Division I–AA/FCS

Conference memberships
1991–1992: Division III Independent
1993–1994: Division II Independent
1995–1996: Eastern Collegiate Football Conference
1997–1998: Eastern Football Conference
1999–present: Northeast Conference

Notable former players
 E.J. Nemeth - York Capitals
 DeVeren Johnson - Dallas Cowboys
 Jon Corto - Buffalo Bills
 Gregory Tonzola - New Jersey Xtreme
 Chris Rogers - KCEN-TV
 Gordon Hill - San Diego Chargers
 Josh Sokol - Minnesota Vikings
 Julius Chestnut - Tennessee Titans
 Victor Benson - New Haven Ninjas

Championships

Conference championships

† denotes co-championship

Playoff appearances

NCAA Division I-AA/FCS
Sacred Heart has made four appearances in the FCS playoffs. Their combined record is 0–4.

Future non-conference opponents 
Future non-conference opponents announced as of January 20, 2023.

References

External links
 

 
American football teams established in 1993
1991 establishments in Connecticut